PUC or P.U.C. may refer to:

Education 
 Pacific Union College
 Pre-university course
 Pentecost University College

 Premier University, Chittagong
 Pontifical Catholic University (from Pontificia Universidad(e) Católica)
 Pontifical Catholic University of Chile, in Santiago
 Purdue University Calumet, a former branch of Purdue University and now a campus of Purdue University Northwest

Organizations 
 Postal Union Congress, a meeting of the Universal Postal Union
 Public utilities commission

Places 
 Puc, a Polish village
 Puc, Kostel, Slovenia

Sports 
 Paris Université Club, multi-sports club in Paris, France 
 Paris Université Club (rugby union), rugby union section of the multi-sports club
 Paris Université Club (baseball), baseball section of the multi-sports club
 Paris Université Club (basketball), basketball section of the multi-sports club

Other 
 Personal unblocking code for 3GPP phones, or personal unlocking key (PUK)
 Pathé Unlimited Card, a pass for unlimited entrance at all Pathé movie theaters in the Netherlands
 Presidential Unit Citation (disambiguation), an award bestowed to military units by some countries
 Principle of Universal Causation, in philosophy